Sansinena is an Argentinian football club from the city of General Daniel Cerri, Bahía Blanca Partido, Buenos Aires Province. It was founded on 12 June 1914 and currently plays in the Torneo Federal A.

Current squad

References

 
Football clubs in Argentina
Association football clubs established in 1914